Mauricio Antonio Arias González (born 27 October 1984) is a Chilean footballer who plays as a left-back for Timorese club Karketu Dili.

Career
Having played for Primera B side Arturo Fernández Vial in the 2021 season, Arias moved to East Timor and joined Karketu Dili in 2023.

Honours

Club
Everton
Primera División de Chile (1): 2008 Apertura

Universidad de Chile
Primera División de Chile (1): 2009 Apertura

References

External links
 Mauricio Arias at Football-Lineups
 
 
 

1984 births
Living people
Sportspeople from Concepción, Chile
Chilean footballers
Chilean expatriate footballers
C.D. Huachipato footballers
Ñublense footballers
Everton de Viña del Mar footballers
Universidad de Chile footballers
O'Higgins F.C. footballers
Audax Italiano footballers
Nueva Chicago footballers
Talleres de Córdoba footballers
Gimnasia y Esgrima de Jujuy footballers
PKNS F.C. players
Santiago Morning footballers
CA San Cristóbal players
C.D. Arturo Fernández Vial footballers
Chilean Primera División players
Primera Nacional players
Argentine Primera División players
Malaysia Super League players
Primera B de Chile players
Liga Dominicana de Fútbol players
Expatriate footballers in Argentina
Chilean expatriate sportspeople in Argentina
Expatriate footballers in Malaysia
Chilean expatriate sportspeople in Malaysia
Expatriate footballers in the Dominican Republic
Chilean expatriate sportspeople in the Dominican Republic
Expatriate footballers in East Timor
Chilean expatriate sportspeople in East Timor
Association football fullbacks